Andrzej Bogdan Cofalik  is a weightlifter  from Poland. He won the Bronze medal in the 83 kg  in the  1996 Summer Olympics in Atlanta.

References 

Polish male weightlifters
Olympic weightlifters of Poland
Weightlifters at the 1996 Summer Olympics
Weightlifters at the 1992 Summer Olympics
Olympic bronze medalists for Poland
Olympic medalists in weightlifting
1968 births
Living people
People from Rybnik County
Medalists at the 1996 Summer Olympics
21st-century Polish people
20th-century Polish people